Loïc Duval (born 12 June 1982) is a French professional racing driver racing for Audi Sport as a factory driver in DTM and driving for Dragon Racing in Formula E. He won the 2013 24 Hours of Le Mans with Allan McNish and Tom Kristensen driving the Audi R18 for Audi Sport. So far he won 42 races in the different categories he raced.

Career

Born in Chartres, Duval began his career in karting and in 2002 was the Formula Campus France champion. In 2003 he was the Formula Renault 2000 France champion. In 2004 he placed eleventh with two podiums in the Formula 3 Euro Series and tested for Renault F1. The next year he finished sixth in F3 Euro Series and won a pole at the Macau Grand Prix. He then moved to Japan where he began racing in Formula Nippon and Super GT. In 2007 he continued in Formula Nippon and made two starts for A1 Team France in the A1 Grand Prix series in Australia and New Zealand. He won the 2009 Formula Nippon Championship with four wins driving for Nakajima Racing after finishing second in 2008.

On 11 June 2014, the Le Mans Audi No. 1 driven by Duval was severely damaged, casting doubt whether it could be repaired for the race, or if Audi could build a new car in time, which would start from the back of the field. Duval was in reasonable condition, considering the magnitude of the accident.

Formula E (2015-2017)

Duval made his Formula E debut at the 2015 Miami ePrix in March 2015, having missed the first four races of the inaugural 2014-15 Formula E season.  He replaced Oriol Servià and partnered Jérôme d'Ambrosio at Dragon Racing, an American and former Indy team.  Despite a slow start to his career, Duval achieved his first podium finish of the season with 3rd place at the 2015 Berlin ePrix with teammate d'Ambrosio winning the race resulting in Dragon Racing first double podium finish.  Duval made second appearance to the podium at round two of the London ePrix in the season finale.  Duval finished the season in 9th position with 42 points having raced in seven of the eleven championship rounds.  Duval's contributions helped Dragon Racing finish 2nd in the Championship having spent the majority of the season outside the top five.

2015-16

Duval started the 2015–16 season off strongly having out qualified teammate d'Ambrosio in the opening two rounds. Duval finished fourth in Beijing, the first time he has outraced teammate d'Ambrosio. During the following round in Putrajaya, Duval crashed while fighting for a podium in the closing stages of the race. In Punta del Este, Duval qualified second on the front row alongside d'Ambrosio resulting in Dragon Racing's first front row lockout. He finished fourth, two tenths of a second behind his teammate in third.

Racing record

Career summary

† Ineligible for championship points.
‡ Team standings.
* Season still in progress.

Complete Formula 3 Euro Series results
(key)

† Driver did not finish the race, but was classified as he completed over 90% of the race distance.

Complete Formula Nippon/Super Formula results
(key) (Races in bold indicate pole position; races in italics indicate fastest lap)

Complete Super GT results

Complete A1 Grand Prix results
(key) (Races in bold indicate pole position) (Races in italics indicate fastest lap)

Complete 24 Hours of Le Mans results

Complete FIA World Endurance Championship results

* Season still in progress.

Complete Formula E results
(key) (Races in bold indicate pole position; races in italics indicate fastest lap)

† Driver did not finish the race, but was classified as he completed more than 90% of the race distance.

Complete Deutsche Tourenwagen Masters results
(key) (Races in bold indicate pole position) (Races in italics indicate fastest lap)

† Driver did not finish, but was classified as he completed 75% of the race distance.

Complete IMSA SportsCar Championship results

* Season still in progress.

Complete 24 Hours of Daytona results

Complete European Le Mans Series results

† As Duval was a guest driver, he was ineligible to score points.

References

External links

 
 

1982 births
Living people
Sportspeople from Chartres
French racing drivers
Karting World Championship drivers
Formule Campus Renault Elf drivers
French Formula Renault 2.0 drivers
Formula 3 Euro Series drivers
Formula Nippon drivers
Super Formula drivers
A1 Team France drivers
24 Hours of Le Mans drivers
24 Hours of Le Mans winning drivers
European Le Mans Series drivers
Super GT drivers
American Le Mans Series drivers
Asian Le Mans Series drivers
FIA World Endurance Championship drivers
Formula E drivers
WeatherTech SportsCar Championship drivers
24 Hours of Daytona drivers
12 Hours of Sebring drivers
A1 Grand Prix drivers
Audi Sport drivers
Peugeot Sport drivers
Deutsche Tourenwagen Masters drivers
Phoenix Racing drivers
Dragon Racing drivers
Graff Racing drivers
Signature Team drivers
ART Grand Prix drivers
Nakajima Racing drivers
Oreca drivers
Dandelion Racing drivers
TOM'S drivers
Team Joest drivers
Team LeMans drivers
G-Drive Racing drivers
TDS Racing drivers
Rebellion Racing drivers
JDC Motorsports drivers
La Filière drivers
DragonSpeed drivers
DAMS drivers